James Wiley may refer to:

James S. Wiley, U.S. Representative from Maine
James T. Wiley, U.S. Army Air Corps/U.S. Air Force Officer and member of the Tuskegee Airmen
James Wiley (Medal of Honor), Union soldier during the American Civil War, recipient of the Medal of Honor
James Franklin Wiley, member of the Wisconsin State Senate
Jim Wiley, Canadian ice hockey player and coach

See also
 James Willey, composer
 Sir James Wylie, military doctor